The Bouquinquant Brothers (French: Les frères Bouquinquant) is a 1947 French drama film directed by Louis Daquin and starring Albert Préjean, Madeleine Robinson and Roger Pigaut. It is based on the 1930 novel The Bouquinquant Brothers by Jean Prévost. It premiered at the 1947 Venice Film Festival and went on general release in France the following year. The film's sets were designed by the art director Paul Bertrand. It marked the film debut of the actress Juliette Gréco.

Synopsis
Julie Moret arrives in Paris from the provinces looking for work. She meets and marries Léon Bouquinquant who initially seems charming, but turns out to be a drunken brute. She soon begins to develop feelings for his Pierre.

Cast
 Albert Préjean as 	Léon Bouquinquant
 Madeleine Robinson as Julie Bouquinquant née Moret
 Roger Pigaut as Pierre Bouquinquant
 Mona Dol as 	Madame Leclerc
 Paul Frankeur as 	Le commissaire
 Juliette Gréco as Une religieuse
 Abel Jacquin as 	Louis
 Denise Kerny as 	Une détenue	
 Charles Lavialle as 	Monsieur Thomas 
 Louis Seigner as Le juge d'instruction
 Jean Vilar as 	Le prêtre
 Victor Vina as 	Le médecin

References

Bibliography 
 Goble, Alan. The Complete Index to Literary Sources in Film. Walter de Gruyter, 1999.

External links 
 

1947 films
French drama films
1947 drama films
1940s French-language films
Films directed by Louis Daquin
Films set in Paris
Films based on French novels
1940s French films